A Dolichodouglas (word derived from ancient Greek Δόλιχος (dolichos), the long distance in running and the Douglas' pouch) is the medical term describing an abnormally profound Douglas' pouch (recto-uterine pouch). It may be congenital or acquired. The increased depth of the Douglas' pouch brings it in close anatomical contact with the posterior vaginal wall. Therefore, intestinal loops may apply pressure to this wall, causing a condition known as enterocele, which presents as an outpouching on the posterior vaginal wall. This can be felt and seen during pelvic exam.

See also 
 Vesicouterine pouch
 Rectouterine pouch (Pouch of Douglas)
 Rectovesical pouch

External links 
 JTA 2001 : Elytrocele

Pelvis